Karaikal Ammaiyar (born Punītavatī), meaning "The Revered Mother of Karaikal", is one of the three women amongst the 63 Nayanmars and one of the greatest figures of early Tamil literature. She was born in Karaikal, South India, and probably lived during the 5th century AD. She was a devotee of Shiva.

Early life

Karaikal was a maritime trading city in Chola Nadu. Ammaiyar, whose original name was Punitavati, was born to Dhanadattan in a merchant community known as Nattukottai Nagarathar (also known as Nattukottai Chettiar). She was married to Paramadattan, a wealthy merchant from Nagapattinam.

Ammaiyar Image in Cambodia

Banteay Srei or Banteay Srey is a 10th-century Cambodian temple dedicated to the Hindu god Shiva.

The second enclosure

The inner enclosure wall has collapsed, leaving a gopura at the eastern end and a brick shrine at the western. The eastern pediment of the gopura shows Śiva Nataraja; the west-facing pediment has an image of Karaikal Ammaiyar, one of the three women saints amongst the sixty three Nayanmars (hounds of Śiva).

Notes

References 
 Dallapiccola, Anna. Dictionary of Hindu Lore and Legend
 Karavelane (in French). Kareikkalammeiyar, oeuvres editees et traduites, institut francais d'indologie, Pondicherry (1956)
 Jagadeesan, N. The Life and Mission of Karaikkal Ammaiyar Bhattacharya, N.N. [ed] Medieval Bhakti Movements in India Munishiram Manoharlal, New Delhi (1989), pages 149–161
Rajarajan, R.K.K. (2018) Recollection of Memories: Hymns of Kāraikkālammaiyār - South Indian Śaiva Iconography. In Sudipa Ray Bandyopadhyay and Swati Mondal Adhikari, eds. Śaiva Iconography: A Facet of Indian Art and Culture. Kolkata: Sagnik Books, pp. 73–92 & 141-147 (Pl.VII.1-13). .
 Schouten, Jan Peter (in Dutch). Goddelijke vergezichten – mystiek uit India voor westerse lezers, Ten Have b.v., Baarn, the Netherlands (1996), 
 de Bruijn, Peter. Kāraikkālammaiyār: Part 1: An iconographical and textual study; Part 2: Poems for Siva  2007. 147 pp. colour, B/W plates.
 Craddock, Elaine Śiva's Demon Devotee: Kāraikkāl Ammaiyār, SUNY Press, Albany (2010), 
 McGlashan, Alastair The History of The Holy Servants of the Lord Siva, page 161 Trafford (2006),

External links
 Karaikal Ammaiyar
 Karaikkal Ammaiyar in Sri Lanka, article in Dutch on Karaikkalammaiyar

See also
Parayi petta panthirukulam

Ammaiyar
Hindu female religious leaders